Trousseau, a French term for "small bundle",  may refer to:

A dowry
The wardrobe and belongings of a bride, including the wedding dress or similar clothing
A hope chest, glory box or its contents
Trousseau (grape), a wine grape also known as Bastardo
Trousseau Gris, a white mutation of the Trousseau grape
Armand Trousseau (1801–67), French internist
Georges Phillipe Trousseau (1833–1894), French physician and royal doctor of Hawaii
Trousseau syndrome, a migratory thrombophlebitis associated with carcinomas of the lung and pancreas
Trousseau sign of latent tetany, a sign of hypocalcemia

See also
Truso, an ancient town in East Prussia